Dmitri Igorevich Ivanov (born 14 February 1987) is a Russian former professional footballer.

Club career
He made his professional debut in the Russian First Division in 2005 for FC Petrotrest St. Petersburg.

References

1987 births
Living people
Russian footballers
Association football defenders
FC Rostov players
FC Anzhi Makhachkala players
FC Petrotrest players
FC Volgar Astrakhan players
FC Fakel Voronezh players
FC Tyumen players
FC Khimki players
FC Vereya players
Russian Premier League players
First Professional Football League (Bulgaria) players
Footballers from Saint Petersburg
FC Dynamo Saint Petersburg players